UHQ or Uhq may refer to:

 Ultra high quality
 Utah Historical Quarterly
 Unhexquadium